Phyllaplysia taylori, synonym Phyllaplysia zostericola, common names the "eelgrass sea hare" and "Taylor's sea hare", is a species of sea slug, specifically a sea hare, a marine gastropod mollusk in the family Aplysiidae, the sea hares.

Some authors place this genus in a separate family, Dolabriferidae.

A more general description of sea hares can be found on the page of the superfamily Aplysioidea.

Distribution
This species occurs on the Pacific Coast of the US, occurring from British Columbia, Canada, to San Diego, CA, USA

Description
Two color morphs of this sea hare have been observed, bright green, and yellow, with characteristic black and white stripes (see Beeman 1970 for more complete description)

This is a rather primitive species. It has a dorsally flattened body, it is well camouflaged, being found almost exclusively on eelgrass, Zostera marina. It grazes on epiphytes that settle on Zostera blades - sponges and diatoms.

Predators
Possible predators include sunfish and sea stars of the genus Solaster.

References

External links
 Photo of Taylor's Sea Hare

Aplysiidae
Gastropods described in 1900